Nikola IV may refer to:

Several members of the House of Frankopan:
 Nikola IV Frankopan (1360–1432)
 Nikola IV Zrinski (1507–1566)

See also

 Frankopan family tree
 
 Nicholas IV (disambiguation)
 Nikola (disambiguation)